The Lausanne Palace is a historic luxury hotel in Lausanne, Switzerland. It is located in the city centre, near the Esplanade of Montbenon and has a view on Le Flon on one side and on the Lake Léman on the other. It is owned by  the Sandoz Family Foundation.

Presidents of the International Olympic Committee 

Since 1994, Lausanne is recognised as the Olympic Capital; the Lausanne Palace was the residence of three presidents of the International Olympic Committee: Juan Antonio Samaranch (1980–2001), Jacques Rogge (2001–2013) and Thomas Bach (2013–).

See also 
 Beau-Rivage Palace

Notes and references

External links 

Hotels in Switzerland
Buildings and structures in Lausanne
Hotel buildings completed in 1915
Hotels established in 1915
Art Deco architecture
Tourist attractions in Lausanne
1915 establishments in Switzerland
20th-century architecture in Switzerland